Robert John Pinsent (1797 in Newfoundland – 1876 in London, United Kingdom) magistrate and politician ran in the first general election held in Newfoundland in 1832 to represent the district of Conception Bay. He had lost to Charles Cozens, Peter Brown and Robert Pack in an election that took 4 days to complete the balloting.

Pinsent, son of William Pinsent was born in the Conception Bay area into a wealthy merchant class. He was appointed magistrate in Brigus in 1836 then magistrate of Harbour Grace shortly after. He was appointed Justice of the Peace in 1851. Pinsent served as judge of the Labrador court from 1863 to 1874. He was made a member of the Executive Council in 1862.

In 1874 he retired to London and died two years later.

See also
 List of people of Newfoundland and Labrador
 List of communities in Newfoundland and Labrador

External links
Biography at the Dictionary of Canadian Biography Online

1797 births
1876 deaths
Members of the Executive Council of Newfoundland and Labrador
Newfoundland Colony judges